Pangil, officially the Municipality of Pangil,  is a 4th class municipality in the province of Laguna, Philippines. According to the 2020 census, it has a population of 25,026 people.

Etymology
According to a paper entitled "Alamat ng Pangil, Laguna" written by Santiago T. Adre, there are three commonly believed and popular theories from which the name "Pangil" was derived.

One theory reveals that the town derived its name from the peculiar shape of the land area of the town looked like especially when viewed from a high place. The town's shape resembles a wild boar's Fang.

The second theory shows that the town's name was derived from the name of the pioneer settlers in this area who were known as "Panguilagan". The town was eventually given the name "Panguil" (this is the spelling which appears in moost Spanish Era documents) because most of the Spaniards had a hard time pronouncing the original term "Panguilagan".

The last theory discloses that the town's first pre-Hispanic leader, a certain "Gat Paguil". When the Spaniards had reached the area, it was this leader whom they recognized and talked with.

It was when the Americans came and took control of the Philippines in 1898, that the former name "Panguil" became what its present name "Pangil".

History
The town is one of the oldest settlements in Laguna, rich in Hispanic, American and Japanese history. Discovered artifacts of the 12th century Ming and Sung Dynasty were attributed to Chinese immigrants and traders who settled in this place then. According to oral literature, the first leader of the area, which now encompasses four separate towns, was Gat Pangil, who united four ancient settlements to establish a Tagalog kingdom in the area. During the Hispanic period, Pangil became a staging ground of the Spanish missionaries in Christian Evangelization drive in 1578 in the provinces of Rizal, Laguna and Tayabas until it gained recognition as a town through the Franciscan friars in the year 1579.

Pangil has a high advocacy for environmental protection and fast becoming a hub for ecotourism. Vested with all sorts of natural attributes, such as clean and pristine water included its natural falls, rivers, nature trails, forest, communities by the lake, cool breeze by the lake, Baguio-like microclimate in its upland, represents a wide array of highland, lowland and lake-ecosystems. It also holds a vast of natural attributes that a small and simple town can possibly be contented of and when these resources are sustainably developed. And can contribute to provide all its need to move forward as a very progressive yet an environment-friendly municipality.

The municipality is strategically situated at the southern tip of Sierra Madre mountain range (six barangays) and along the eastern margin of Jalajala Peninsula and just west of the northwestern shore of the easternmost major embayment of Laguna de Bay (two barangays). Its narrow strip of territory traverses in its length by Pangil River (12.5 km long), valued for its pristine and abundant water contributing to its domestic, agricultural, ecotourism and other potential economic uses like bulk water and hydropower. Its topography is generally flat in between rolling and steep hills.

Currently, based on the results of the Barangay Information Management System (BIMS) data, the municipality of Pangil has a total population of 27,711 consisting of 5,728 households, with about 4.84 average household size. Of the eight barangays of Pangil, five are classified as urban barangays which is actually the communities that compose the town proper, one rural barangay in the upland and two other rural barangays across the lake.

King Charles III in Pangil

One of the revered myths in the town of Pangil is the belief that in the year 1724, Prince Carlos, the son of King Philip V of Spain, was banished from his country and was sent to the Philippines. The young prince stayed in the town for three years and resided with the Franciscans in the adjoining convent of the Paroquia del Nuestra Señora de la Natividad Church considered then as the biggest in Laguna. The prince was a known hunter and he enjoyed his stay in the Sierra Madre mountain range that was known as a good hunting ground for wild animals and fowls. He was also very fond of the creek that branched out from the Pangil River and now called as the Bambang Hari or King's Canal.

By the year 1728, the King lifted the ban on the Prince and ordered the latter to return to their kingdom.  With his ascension to the throne of Spain as King Charles III , he ordered his emissaries to send the statue of Nuestra Seńora de la O (Our Lady of Expectation) and the statue of Santo Nińo de la O (Holy Child of Expectation) as a sign of gratitude and appreciation to the Pangilenians for the hospitality and kindness that was accorded to him. Although this story is a source of pride among the Pangilenos, there is nothing in the historical records of the archives of the Franciscan Province in the Philippines or the Archdiocese of Manila, or the Ministerio del Ultramar in Madrid that could corroborate this folk history.

Geography

Barangays

Pangil is politically subdivided into 8 barangays:

 Balian
 Isla (Poblacion)
 Natividad (Poblacion)
 San Jose (Poblacion)
 Sulib (Poblacion)
 Galalan
 Dambo
 Mabato-Azufre

Climate

Demographics

Economy

Government

List of local chief executives
Under the American Civil Government

 1900-1905 Antonio A. Fabricante
 1906-1907 Pedro Dalena
 1908-1909 Agustin Martinez
 1910-1912 Roman Maulawin
 1913-1919 Engracio Balita
 1920-1922 Victor Acapulco
 1923-1925 Antonio Aclan
 1926-1928 Abraham de Guia
 1929-1934 Santiago T. Adre

During the Commonwealth Period

 1935-1937 Canuto Galvez
 1938-1940 Esteban C. Icarangal

During World War II

 1941-1945 Zoilo Pajarillo

During the post- war period

 1946-1947 Santiago T. Adre
 1948-1955 Alfredo M. Fabricante
 1956-1959 Pastor de Ramos
 1960-1963 Geminiano C. Gualberto

During the Marcos dictatorship

 1964-1967 Cristobal T. Demery
 1968-1971 Geminiano C. Gualberto
 1972-1979 Pedro D. Aritao

During the Contemporary Period

 1980-1992 Dominador V. Manzana
 1992-1995 Valentin B. Santa Ana
 1995-2004 Sergio C. Manzana
 2004-2013 Juanita C. Manzana
 2013-2016 Jovit Reyes
 2016-2019 Oscar Rafanan
 2019-2020 Jovit Reyes
 2020–present Gerald A. Aritao

Gallery

See also
Nuestra Señora de la Natividad Parish Church

References

External links

[ Philippine Standard Geographic Code]
Philippine Census Information
Local Governance Performance Management System

Municipalities of Laguna (province)
Populated places established in 1579
Populated places on Laguna de Bay